One Day Remains is the debut studio album by the American hard rock band Alter Bridge, released on August 10, 2004, on Wind-up Records. The album was produced by Ben Grosse, making it the band's only album to not be produced by Michael "Elvis" Baskette as of 2020; additionally, it is the only release by the band on which lead singer Myles Kennedy does not play guitar. It has been certified Gold in the United States as of November 2004, with worldwide sales reaching 750,000. It is said the album received its name from the band members' attitudes that life should be lived as if only one day remains. Guitarist Mark Tremonti also said in an interview that the title is a reference to the title cards that appeared in the 2001 movie Donnie Darko, and it is one of the names the band considered using before settling with Alter Bridge.

Track listing

Track information

"Metalingus"
Although never released as a single, "Metalingus" is one of Alter Bridge's most popular songs and is a live staple. The song had been used by WWE wrestler and Hall of Famer Edge as his entrance theme from 2004 onward. From March to June 2022, he changed his entrance theme to another Alter Bridge song, "The Other Side", which would later be the entrance music for The Judgment Day after Edge left the group. He continued to use "Metalingus" once more after returning at SummerSlam 2022.

"In Loving Memory"
Like "Metalingus", "In Loving Memory" was never released as a single, though it is one of the band's most popular songs among fans. On November 5, 2008 in Glasgow, an electric version of the song was performed for the first time, and has since become a regular feature in their live shows.

Mark Tremonti wrote the song about the death of his mother, Mary Elizabeth Tremonti, who died in 2002. In an interview he said: "There are a lot of themes on this record that are very personal, for example 'In Loving Memory' is about my mother who recently passed away. In terms of purely personal significance, you cannot get any deeper than that. It is definitely a sad song."

Chart performance

Album

Singles

B-sides
"Save Me", featured on the soundtrack to the 2005 film Elektra.
"Solace" has been recorded during the ODR sessions, but it didn't make the record. The song "Solace" was a possible band name they were seriously considering before deciding on Alter Bridge. The lead guitarist Mark Tremonti said that in the guitar one interview from the October 2004 issue, Kennedy was singing a line from it. The intro can be heard played by Tremonti on the DVD The Sound and the Story.  The whole song was included as "rarity" on Live at the O2 Arena + Rarities in 2017.
"Breathe" is another song written and has been recorded during the ODR sessions. It was released on the Best Buy exclusive version of The Last Hero in 2016 as well as on the rarities disc of Live at the O2 Arena + Rarities in 2017.
"Cruel Sun" is another song written and has been recorded during the ODR sessions, but it had yet to be heard until being included as "rarity" on Live at the O2 Arena + Rarities in 2017.

Personnel

Alter Bridge
 Myles Kennedy — lead vocals, co-production, arrangements
 Mark Tremonti — guitars, additional vocals, co-production, arrangements
 Brian Marshall — bass guitar, co-production, arrangements
 Scott Phillips — drums, percussion, co-production, arrangements

Production
 Ben Grosse — production, recording, mixing
 Blumpy — digital engineering and editing, keyboards and programming
 Adam Barber — digital engineering and editing
 Jamie Muhoberac — keyboards and programming
 Shilpa Patel — additional editing and tech support
 Jack Odom and Shaun Evans — recording assistants
 Paul Pavao and Chuck Bailey — mixing and additional recording assistants
 David Campbell — string arrangements on "In Loving Memory" and "The End Is Here"
 Tony Adams — drum tech
 Ernie Hudson — guitar tech
 Tom Baker — mastering at Precision Mastering, Hollywood, CA

Management
 Diana Meltzer — A&R
 Gregg Wattenberg — A&R-Wind-up production supervision
 Chipper — A&R administration
 Jeff Hanson, Jeff Cameron and Randy Dease (JHMP/Bombtrax Management) — management
 Ken Fermaglich and Neil Warnock (The Agency Group — New York & London) — booking agents
 Garry Whitfield and Dave Johnson (Whitfield and Johnson/Temp CFO, Inc.) — business management
 Jim Zumwalt and Orville Almon (Zumwalt, Almon & Hayes) and Mark Passler (Akerman Senterfitt) — legal representation
 Lisa C. Socransky and Brian McClain — additional legal representation
 Andrew Weiss (Lighthouse Touring) — management
 Thom Trumbo (Moir/Marie Entertainment) — producer management and coordination

Artwork
 Daniel Tremonti (Core 12) — art direction and design, photography
 Pat Costa — photography
 Pamela Littky — band photography

Appearances
 An edited version of the song "Open Your Eyes" was featured in the video game Madden NFL 2005 in 2004.
The song "Shed My Skin" was featured on the soundtrack to the 2005 film Fantastic Four.
The song "Metalingus" was featured in the video game WWE SmackDown vs. Raw 2011 in 2010. A remixed and edited version titled You Think You Know Me (Metalingus) was also WWE wrestler Edge's entrance theme song from November 2004 to the present day.

References

2004 debut albums
Alter Bridge albums
Wind-up Records albums